Underhill F.C. is an individually owned premier league football club based in Beitbridge, Zimbabwe. Underhill are playing home matches in Masvingo (Mucheke stadium)
until their own stadium in Beitbridge (Dulibadzimu) is upgraded;

References

Beitbridge
Football clubs in Zimbabwe